Hiskel Tewelde (born 15 September 1986) is a long-distance runner from Eritrea. He competed in the 5000 m event at the 2016 Summer Olympics, but failed to reach the final.

References

1986 births
Living people
Eritrean male long-distance runners
Olympic athletes of Eritrea
Athletes (track and field) at the 2016 Summer Olympics
African Games medalists in athletics (track and field)
African Games bronze medalists for Eritrea
World Athletics Championships athletes for Eritrea
Athletes (track and field) at the 2015 African Games
20th-century Eritrean people
21st-century Eritrean people